The Knight Grain Elevator, near Eureka, Utah, was built in 1915.  It was listed on the National Register of Historic Places in 1979.

It is a  concrete grain elevator built by the Union Grain & Elevator Co., of the Knight investment company.  It is located off Utah State Route 36, west of Eureka in the Tintic Valley.

Information
According to its National Register nomination:  "This structure was part of the Knight Farm, owned by Tintic mining entrepreneur Jesse Knight. Essentially a dry farming venture, the farm represented one of the largest in the Tintic Valley and illustrates Knight's concern and involvement in all aspects of life in a mining area from mines to power plants, mills, smelters, railroads, drain tunnels, and farming."

References

Grain elevators
National Register of Historic Places in Juab County, Utah
Buildings and structures completed in 1915